Achmet Borumborad (fl. 1772–1782), or Achmet Borumbadad, was the assumed name of an eccentric con-artist operating in late 18th-century Dublin, who succeeded in gathering financial support for the construction of a Turkish Baths on the banks of the River Liffey. Purportedly a doctor, he claimed to have been born in Constantinople (Istanbul) from which he had subsequently fled.  In reality, he was the fictitious creation of Patrick Joyce of Kilkenny (who had possibly spent his youth in the Levant), or possibly William Cairns of Dublin. Adopting the persona of a native Turk, his unusual dress style, turban, and exotic affectations attracted much attention in the city at the time, and he was noted as "the first Turk who had ever walked the streets of Dublin in his native costume."

History
Borumborad's (a.k.a. Joyce's) presence in Dublin was first noted in the year 1769, whilst promoting the healing properties of baths and "a pump house" in the modern-day suburb of Finglas, County Dublin. Borumborad was convinced of the healing powers of the local St. Patrick's Well which fed the Finglas baths. The Dictionary of Irish Biography notes he was probably operating a medical practice of some description in the city, although no records attest to any recognised medical qualification he may have achieved. He won the support of a number of Dublin medical professionals, and then lobbied Parliament for money to build 'Hot and Cold Sea-Water Baths' along the quays of the River Liffey, together with free medical attention for the poor who attended. In October 1771, he finally opened his new Turkish baths on Bachelor's Quay (modern day Bachelor's Walk). In 1771, the House of Commons Journals make note of financial support given to 'Dr Achmet' for his baths, and notes are recorded for several following years after. The baths were a great success, with Jonah Barrington (judge, lawyer and prominent Dublin socialite) proclaiming that "a more ingenious or useful establishment could not be formed in any metropolis."

Before every parliamentary session, Borumborad gave a large party, at which wine and song ministered to the good temper of the Members. As historian Maurice Craig contends, "On one occassion, hoping for a larger grant for an extension, he gave a particularly grand entertainment to nearly thirty of the leading Members. Unfortunately, while the Turk was in his cellar bringing up another dozen to finish the good work, a comparatively abstentious Member (Sir John Hamilton) got up to leave. He was pursued by some of the keener drinkers, who with wild cries protested that he must stay to drink the last dozen. He hastened his steps in what he believed to be the direction of the street-entrance, and (since it was dark and the evening well advanced) fell precipitately into the Doctor's great cold bath". Some of the other MPs also fell into the water after him. Borumborad fell out of favour with the group after the incident.

True identity
Borbumborad  fell in love with, and married, the sister of a surgeon named Hartigan, with whom he eventually revealed his true identity after being required to shave his beard and convert to Christianity to prove his devotion. Borbumborad (Joyce) subsequently vanished from the historical record, and his fate thereafter is unknown. Writing his memoirs in the late eighteenth century, Jonah Barrington noted that "I regret that I never inquired as to Joyce’s subsequent career, nor can I say whether he is or not still in the land of the living."

A 1956 article written by Desmond Ryan in the Irish Press, as well as the work of historian Richard Robert Madden, claim that the name Patrick Joyce may also have been a pseudonym, and that the man may actually have been a Dublin-based tradesman by the name of William Cairns.

See also
 List of fictitious people
 Turkish Baths, Lincoln Place, a separate Dublin establishment which opened in 1860.

References

Sources

Fictional con artists
Fictional Turkish people
Fictional Irish people
Fictional people from the 18th-century
Nonexistent people
Nonexistent people used in hoaxes